Martin Rivera (born October 20, 1983), better known as Noztra, is a reggaeton musician. Born in San Francisco de Macorís, Dominican Republic, his family moved to New York City looking for work when he was seven. At the age of 16, Noztra began composing his own lyrics and music.

Biography 
In June 2005, Martin Rivera better known as Noztra made history by being the first Dominican Reggaeton artist in the United States to be signed to a major record label; Universal Records’ Machete Music.  This offered him the ideal platform to expand his brand and be able to open up for artists like Daddy Yankee, Nicky Jam, Tego Calderon, Don Omar, Wisin & Yandel, Ivy Queen, Zion & Lennox and Hector El Father among others.

Noztra has proven to be an undeniable crowd pleaser with his powerful, jampacked, energizing sets. He performed in three Megatons (Houston, NY, LA), Vivaton 2006, Reggaeton Explocion 2 (San Francisco & LA) and at 105.9 FM La Kalle’s Block Party at New York City’s Madison Square Garden.

After two successful mixtapes; Conteo Regresivo 1 & 2, Noztra released his first full-length 19-track album entitled “Ya’ Ain’t Ready.”  The album was produced by Luny Tunes, Nesty, Monserrate & DJ Urba, Notty-Mekka, DJ Sonic, Myztiko and A&X.  The album covered many different sound experimentations including sandungueo, bolero, hip hop and malianteo. His videos off of the album received solid airplay on television networks like MTV en Español, Mun2, HTV, Mas Musica and many others.

The release of his album did not stop Noztra from advancing his career. He also appeared on a slew of compilation albums including Sangre Nueva, El Draft 2005 and Da Fuxion: Mas Que Perreo to name a few.

After all of Noztra’s accomplishments, he decided to take a hiatus from the music and become a successful businessman as well as a family man. Now Noztra is ready to return to the spotlight in more than the genre he paved the way for.  The first release from his new body of work “La Funda” is already on heavy rotation in the Dominican Republic and is making its way to his hometown of New York City.

Fast forward to now, Noztra returns much wiser, with a new focus. His music now has a sexy and grown undertone to it. Being able to do both street records as well as pop records is a natural thing for a natural artist. Noztra is currently working on his new album “Dinero, Poder y Respeto”.

Wait and see what Noztra has in store soon!!

History 
In 2002 he conducted one of the first reggaeton radio shows to air in New York City. Shortly after, Noztra opened shows that featured reggaeton stars.

Noztra entered the scene with his single "Damelo Duro", which was distributed on mixtapes and had great success on radio. His first album, Ya’ Aint Ready, contains 19 tracks and a variety of sounds such as Sandungueo, Bolero, Streets/Gangsta hip hop and social themes. The first single off this album is "El Maquinon", and was produced by Monserrate & DJ Urba. It peaked at number 31 on the Billboard Latin Tropical Airplay chart.

Noztra was the first reggaeton artist to sign with a major label.

Discography

Albums 
 Ya' Aint Ready (2005)

Mixtapes 
 Conteo Regresivo Vol. 1 (2005)
 Conteo Regresivo Vol. 2 (2006)

Compilation appearances 
 Sangre Nueva (2005)
 The Draft (2005)
 The Fuxion: Mas Que Perreo (2005)
 Los Dueños del Flow (2006)

References

External links 
 Interview at CorrienteLatina.com
 Bio at CorrienteLatina.com

21st-century Dominican Republic male singers
Dominican Republic rappers
Dominican Republic people of Spanish descent
Rappers from New York City
Reggaeton musicians
21st-century American rappers
1982 births
Living people